The Team technical routine competition of the 2016 European Aquatics Championships was held on 9 May 2016.

Results
The final was held at 16:30.

References

Synchronised swimming